The Deanery was refer to:

 Deanery Garden, a heritage-listed house in Berkshire, England
 The Deanery, Brisbane, a heritage-listed house (also known as Adelaide House) in Queensland, Australia